Charlotte Tison (born 21 April 1998) is a Belgian footballer who plays as a midfielder for the Belgium women's national team.

References

External links
 

1998 births
Living people
Belgian women's footballers
Women's association football midfielders
Belgium women's international footballers
RSC Anderlecht (women) players
UEFA Women's Euro 2022 players
Belgium women's youth international footballers